Harding Township is a township in Morris County, New Jersey, United States. It is located in the Raritan Valley region within the New York Metropolitan area. The township was formed as a township by an act of the New Jersey Legislature on September 1, 1922, from portions of Passaic Township (since renamed as Long Hill Township), based on the results of a referendum passed on May 9, 1922. As of the 2020 United States census, the population of the township was 3,871, an increase of 33 (+0.9%) from the 2010 census count of 3,838, which in turn reflected an increase of 658 (+20.7%) from the 3,180 counted in the 2000 census.

The long-established hamlets of New Vernon and Green Village (also within Chatham Township) are both located in Harding Township. The township is home to the private club community Mount Kemble Lake, a former summer colony developed in the 1920s.

Described by The New York Times as "one of the most restrictive and elegant of New Jersey's residential suburban areas" and as an "affluent Morris County township", the community has been one of the state's highest-income municipalities. Harding Township had a per capita income of $109,472 and was ranked first in New Jersey based on data from the 2006–2010 American Community Survey from the United States Census Bureau, more than triple the statewide average of $34,858. Based on data from the ACS for 2014–2018, Harding Township ranked sixth in the state with a median household income of $183,587 and had almost half of households earning more than $200 thousand annually.

The 07976 ZIP Code for New Vernon was named one of the "25 Richest ZIP Codes" in the United States by Forbes magazine in 2006. Many relatively unchanged large country estates that have been passed down through several generations attest to the wealth of many of its residents. Some have been listed on the National Register of Historic Places and some have nonprofit support organizations that assure the retention of the original nature of the properties.

History 
The lake finally drained when a blockage of the Passaic River reopened. The Great Swamp is the remnant of the lake bottom and portions of the swamp lay in what now is the township. Once the lake drained, higher areas became a wooded area that was used for hunting, fishing, and farming by Native Americans. At the time of colonization by the Dutch it belonged to the Lenape tribes, but British colonists did their best to displace them westward.

Much of what now is known as Harding was an agricultural community with roots stretching as far back as the early 18th century.  Bypassed by colonial turnpikes, revolution era canals, and railroads laid in the Victorian era, the area remained a rural backwater.  For almost two centuries of European occupation, its open and rolling landscapes reflected its agricultural use, as land had been cleared for cattle pastures, orchards, and fields of grain.  The Great Swamp, the wooded slopes of the Watchung Mountains, and those near Jockey Hollow also were used by local farmers for wood supply.  The communities of Green Village, Logansville, New Vernon, and Pleasantville were the village centers in this agricultural community.

Wealthy urban residents from Manhattan and Newark bought farmland, enlarged old farmhouses, and landscaped the grounds.  The movement to establish Harding Township was driven by local property owners who wanted to maintain a bucolic community without suburban development.

The township was created in 1922 from the northern half of what was then Passaic Township (present day Long Hill Township) and it was named after the incumbent President of the United States, Warren G. Harding.

The New Vernon Neighborhood Restrictive Agreement was established in 1928 by estate owners under which they agreed to voluntarily place restrictive covenants on their land that would require future owners of the properties to maintain the rural nature of the area.

Geography 
According to the United States Census Bureau, the township had a total area of 20.57 square miles (53.28 km2), including 20.05 square miles (51.94 km2) of land and 0.52 square miles (1.34 km2) of water (2.51%).
The township includes unincorporated communities, a portion of Green Village and all of New Vernon, both of which have origins as colonial settlements that predate the American Revolution. The governmental offices for the township are in New Vernon.

Other unincorporated communities, localities and place names located partially or completely within the township include Baileys Mill, Dickson Mill, Glen Alpin, Jockey Hollow Park, Logansville, Mount Kemble Lake, Olmstead Mills, Osborn Mill, Pleasantville, Sugar Loaf and Van Dorens Mill.

The township borders Mendham Township to the west, Madison to the northeast, Chatham Township to the east, Morris Township to the north, and Long Hill Township to the southeast in Morris County and Bernardsville to the southwest and Bernards Township to the south in Somerset County.

Demographics

Population

Census 2010

The Census Bureau's 2006–2010 American Community Survey showed that (in 2010 inflation-adjusted dollars) median household income was $168,365 (with a margin of error of +/− $37,371) and the median family income was $185,647 (+/− $30,739). Males had a median income of $123,854 (+/− $38,454) versus $66,131 (+/− $25,727) for females. The per capita income for the borough was $109,472 (+/− $24,951). About 6.8% of families and 7.5% of the population were below the poverty line, including 13.5% of those under age 18 and 3.3% of those age 65 or over.

Census 2000
As of the 2000 United States census there were 3,180 people, 1,180 households, and 940 families residing in the township.  The population density was 155.6 people per square mile (60.1/km2).  There were 1,243 housing units at an average density of 60.8 per square mile (23.5/km2).  The racial makeup of the township was 97.20% White, 0.41% African American, 1.07% Asian, 0.03% Pacific Islander, 0.22% from other races, and 1.07% from two or more races. Hispanic or Latino of any race were 1.79% of the population.

There were 1,180 households, out of which 32.6% had children under the age of 18 living with them, 72.3% were married couples living together, 5.2% had a female householder with no husband present, and 20.3% were non-families. 17.6% of all households were made up of individuals, and 8.5% had someone living alone who was 65 years of age or older. The average household size was 2.69 and the average family size was 3.03.

In the township the population was spread out, with 25.2% under the age of 18, 3.6% from 18 to 24, 21.9% from 25 to 44, 32.9% from 45 to 64, and 16.4% who were 65 years of age or older.  The median age was 44 years. For every 100 females, there were 93.9 males. For every 100 females age 18 and over, there were 91.9 males.

The median income for a household in the township was $111,297, and the median income for a family was $128,719. Males had a median income of $95,737 versus $57,308 for females. The per capita income for the township was $72,689. None of the families and 1.1% of the population were living below the poverty line, including none under eighteen and 3.3% of those over 64.

Government

Local government 
Harding Township is governed under the Township form of New Jersey municipal government, one of 141 municipalities (of the 564 statewide that use this form, the second-most commonly used form of government in the state. The Township Committee is comprised of five members, who are elected directly by the voters at-large in partisan elections to serve three-year terms of office on a staggered basis, with either one or two seats coming up for election each year as part of the November general election in a three-year cycle. At an annual reorganization meeting held during the first week of January, the Township Committee selects one of its members to serve as Mayor and another as Deputy Mayor, each serving terms of one year.

Eleven standing committees are appointed at the reorganization meeting including planning, zoning and legal; finance and insurance; public safety; public works and building; personnel; recreation commission; freeholder liaison; Glen Alpin Steering liaison; school board liaison; open space liaison; and board of health liaison.  Two members of the township committee serve on each standing committee and provide oversight to the departments.

, members of the Harding Township Committee are Mayor Timothy D. Jones (R, term on committee ends December 31, 2024; term as mayor ends 2022), Deputy Mayor Christopher M. Yates (R, term on committee ends 2023; term as deputy mayor ends 2022), Rita Chipperson (2023), Nicole Lacz (2024) and Nicolas Platt (R, 2022).

Federal, state and county representation 
Harding Township is located in the 11th Congressional District and is part of New Jersey's 27th state legislative district. Prior to the 2011 reapportionment following the 2010 Census, Harding Township had been in the 21st state legislative district.

 

Morris County is governed by a Board of County Commissioners comprised of seven members who are elected at-large in partisan elections to three-year terms on a staggered basis, with either one or three seats up for election each year as part of the November general election. Actual day-to-day operation of departments is supervised by County Administrator, John Bonanni. , Morris County's Commissioners are
Commissioner Director Tayfun Selen (R, Chatham Township, term as commissioner ends December 31, 2023; term as director ends 2022),
Commissioner Deputy Director John Krickus (R, Washington Township, term as commissioner ends 2024; term as deputy director ends 2022),
Douglas Cabana (R, Boonton Township, 2022), 
Kathryn A. DeFillippo (R, Roxbury, 2022),
Thomas J. Mastrangelo (R, Montville, 2022),
Stephen H. Shaw (R, Mountain Lakes, 2024) and
Deborah Smith (R, Denville, 2024).
The county's constitutional officers are the County Clerk and County Surrogate (both elected for five-year terms of office) and the County Sheriff (elected for a three-year term). , they are 
County Clerk Ann F. Grossi (R, Parsippany–Troy Hills, 2023),
Sheriff James M. Gannon (R, Boonton Township, 2022) and
Surrogate Heather Darling (R, Roxbury, 2024).

Politics
As of March 23, 2011, there were a total of 3,025 registered voters in Harding Township, of which 466 (15.4%) were registered as Democrats, 1,443 (47.7%) were registered as Republicans and 1,115 (36.9%) were registered as Unaffiliated. There was one voter registered to another party.

In the 2012 presidential election, Republican Mitt Romney received 70.4% of the vote (1,607 cast), ahead of Democrat Barack Obama with 28.6% (654 votes), and other candidates with 1.0% (22 votes), among the 2,295 ballots cast by the township's 3,195 registered voters (12 ballots were spoiled), for a turnout of 71.8%. In the 2008 presidential election, Republican John McCain received 61.9% of the vote (1,516 cast), ahead of Democrat Barack Obama with 36.7% (898 votes) and other candidates with 0.9% (23 votes), among the 2,449 ballots cast by the township's 3,139 registered voters, for a turnout of 78.0%. In the 2004 presidential election, Republican George W. Bush received 66.8% of the vote (1,618 ballots cast), outpolling Democrat John Kerry with 32.1% (778 votes) and other candidates with 0.7% (20 votes), among the 2,421 ballots cast by the township's 3,040 registered voters, for a turnout percentage of 79.6.

In the 2013 gubernatorial election, Republican Chris Christie received 82.0% of the vote (1,193 cast), ahead of Democrat Barbara Buono with 16.6% (242 votes), and other candidates with 1.3% (19 votes), among the 1,476 ballots cast by the township's 3,200 registered voters (22 ballots were spoiled), for a turnout of 46.1%. In the 2009 gubernatorial election, Republican Chris Christie received 68.4% of the vote (1,280 ballots cast), ahead of Democrat Jon Corzine with 20.5% (384 votes), Independent Chris Daggett with 10.5% (197 votes) and other candidates with 0.3% (5 votes), among the 1,871 ballots cast by the township's 3,099 registered voters, yielding a 60.4% turnout.

Education 
The Harding Township School District serves public school students in pre-kindergarten through eighth grade at Harding Township School. As of the 2020–21 school year, the district, comprised of one school, had an enrollment of 274 students and 41.8 classroom teachers (on an FTE basis), for a student–teacher ratio of 6.6:1.

For ninth through twelfth grades, public school students attend Madison High School in Madison, as part of a sending/receiving relationship with the Madison Public Schools. As of the 2020–21 school year, the high school had an enrollment of 876 students and 74.6 classroom teachers (on an FTE basis), for a student–teacher ratio of 11.7:1.

Transportation

Roads and highways

Interstate 287 is the most prominent highway within Harding Township, though there are no exits within the township. The nearest exits, 30 and 33, are both just outside the township in neighboring Bernards Township and Morris Township, respectively. U.S. Route 202 is the main highway providing local access to Harding Township.

Public transportation
Many Harding residents commute to jobs in Manhattan. There are private van shuttles that make the 45-minute trip to Jersey City or Hoboken, where ferries and PATH make the short journey across the Hudson River to Lower Manhattan. Additionally, many residents use the Madison, Morristown, and other nearby train stations to commute to Midtown Manhattan.

NJ Transit had provided local bus service on the MCM8 route until 2010, when subsidies were eliminated to the local service provider as part of budget cuts.

Notable people 

People who were born in, residents of, or otherwise closely associated with Harding Township include:

 William O. Baker (1915–2005), former head of Bell Labs
 James J. Barry Jr. (born 1946), politician who served in the New Jersey General Assembly and was Director of the New Jersey Division of Consumer Affairs
 Michelle Cesan (born 1991), field hockey player who competed for the United States women's national field hockey team in the women's event at the 2012 Summer Olympics
 Ray Chambers (born 1942), UN Special Envoy for Malaria
 Steve Conine (born 1972/73), co-founder of the online retailer Wayfair
 Ned Crotty (born 1986), professional lacrosse player with the Chrome Lacrosse Club of the Premier Lacrosse League
 Marcellus Hartley Dodge Sr. (1881–1963), lived at Hartley Farms, a large estate in New Vernon, from the time he was married
 Regina Egea, Chief of Staff to Governor Chris Christie
 Peter Frelinghuysen Jr. (1916–2011), politician who represented New Jersey's 5th congressional district in the United States House of Representatives from 1953 to 1975
 Rodney Frelinghuysen (born 1946), politician who represented New Jersey's 11th congressional district from 1995 to 2019
 Justin Gimelstob (born 1977), professional tennis player
 Barry Halper (1939–2005), extensive collector of baseball memorabilia who had been a limited partner owning about 1% of the New York Yankees
 Kerry Kittles (born 1974), former professional basketball player
 Eric Mangini (born 1971), former head coach of the New York Jets
 Josephine Margetts (1901–1989), politician who served as a member of the New Jersey General Assembly from 1967 to 1973.
 Bart Oates (born 1958), former professional football player who played for the New York Giants
 Morgan Pearson (born 1993), professional triathlete who won a silver medal in the mixed relay event at the 2020 Summer Olympics
 William E. Simon (1927–2000), United States Secretary of the Treasury for Nixon and Ford
 Bo Sullivan (1937–2000), chairman of the New Jersey Turnpike Authority and a Republican Party politician who sought the nomination for Governor of New Jersey in the 1981 primary
 Jim Weaver, chef, author and a pioneer in the Slow Food movement

References

External links 

Harding Township website
Harding Township School

School Data for the Harding Township School, National Center for Education Statistics
Harding Township Civic Association

 
1922 establishments in New Jersey
Populated places established in 1922
Township form of New Jersey government
Townships in Morris County, New Jersey